Anderson station is a CTrain light rail station in Southwood, Calgary, Alberta, Canada. It serves the South Line (Route 201) and it opened on May 25, 1981, as part of the original line until October 8, 2001 as the southern terminus of Route 201. The station is located on the exclusive LRT right of way (adjacent to CPR ROW), 10.6 km south of the City Hall Interlocking. The station is located just north of Anderson Road west of Macleod Trail. The station is located across from Southcentre Mall, through a pedestrian bridge that crosses Macleod Trail. 

The station consists of a centre-loading platform with Mezzanine access at the South end and grade-level access at the North end. 1323 paved parking spaces are located on-site, as well as a 427 space overflow lot.

Construction of the Anderson Station platform that was meant for 3 cars was expanded to accommodate 4 cars starting in June 2013, and was completed in the late fall of 2013.

In January 2018, the south entrance to the Mezzanine level was closed as crews removed the entrance in preparation for renovations. On April 2, 2018, the Mezzanine level was closed to perform renovations. The grade-level entrance remained open, as well as the station itself while renovations are underway. Renovations were expected to be completed by October 2018 but due to soil and structural issues arising during construction, the completion date was extended to Spring of 2019 with construction being completed in June 2019.

The Anderson Shops and Garage, where the CTrain vehicles are maintained, is located here. CTrains operating on the NE line had to come up from the Anderson Garage every morning from the opening of the NE line in 1985 until the Oliver Bowen Maintenance Facility opened with McKnight–Westwinds Station in 2008.

In 2005, the station registered and average transit of 11,300 boardings per weekday.

References

CTrain stations
Railway stations in Canada opened in 1981
1981 establishments in Alberta